Antonis Magas (born 28 February 1994) is a Greek professional footballer who plays as a centre-back for Football League club Ierapetra.

Honours
Thiva
Boeotia FCA Cup: 2017–18

References

1994 births
Living people
Greek footballers
Super League Greece players
Football League (Greece) players
Gamma Ethniki players
Levadiakos F.C. players
A.E. Sparta P.A.E. players
Aittitos Spata F.C. players
O.F. Ierapetra F.C. players
Association football defenders
Footballers from Livadeia